Greg McLean may refer to:
 Greg McLean (film director), Australian film director, producer and writer
 Greg McLean (politician), Canadian politician